This is a list of the principal squares of Yerevan, the capital of Armenia.

Ajapnyak District

Arabkir District

Barekamutyun Square
Mher Mkrtchyan Square

Avan District

Davtashen District

Erebuni District

Sasuntsi Davit Square
Erebuni Square

Kanaker-Zeytun District

Kentron District
Republic Square
Freedom Square
Charles Aznavour Square
Andrei Sakharov Square
Square of Russia
Place de France
Stepan Shahumyan Square
Alexandr Myasnikyan Square
Khachatur Abovyan Square
Square of Uruguay
Square of Brazil

Malatia-Sebastia District

Nork-Marash District
Győr Square

Nubarashen District

Shengavit District

Garegin Nzhdeh Square
Labours' Square

Geography of Yerevan
Tourist attractions in Yerevan
Squares
Squares
Squares